Biomedical technology is the application of engineering and technology principles to the domain of living or biological systems, with an emphasis on human health and diseases.

Biomedical engineering and Biotechnology alike are often loosely called Biomedical Technology or Bioengineering. The Biomedical technology field is currently growing at a rapid pace. Required jobs for the industry expect to grow 23% by 2024, and with the pay averaging over $86,000.  

Biomedical technology involves:

 Biomedical science
 Biomedical informatics
 Biomedical research
 Biomedical engineering
 Bioengineering
 Biotechnology

Biomedical technologies:

 Cloning
 Therapeutic cloning

References

Biological engineering